The Monkees were an American pop rock band formed in Los Angeles in 1966, comprising Micky Dolenz, Michael Nesmith, Peter Tork and Davy Jones. They were conceived in 1965 as a fictional band for the sitcom The Monkees by the television producers Bob Rafelson and Bert Schneider. Music credited to the Monkees appeared in the sitcom, which aired from 1966 to 1968, and was released on LP.

While the sitcom was a mostly straightforward affair, the music production generated tension and controversy almost from the beginning. Music supervisor Don Kirshner was dissatisfied with the quartet's musical abilities, and he limited their involvement during the recording process, relying instead on professional songwriters and studio musicians. This arrangement yielded multiple hit albums and singles, but it did not sit well with the band members, who were facing a public backlash for not playing on the recordings. After a brief power struggle, the band members gained full control over the recording process. For two albums, the Monkees mostly performed as a group, but, within a year, each member was pursuing his own interests under the Monkees name. By the end of 1968, they were once again a group in name only, the show had been canceled, and their motion picture, Head, had flopped. Tork left the band soon after, followed by Nesmith a year later, and the Monkees officially broke up in 1970.

A revival of interest in the television show came in 1986, leading to a series of official reunion tours, a television special, and four new full-length records, all of which spanned the next 35 years, though these efforts rarely featured all four members performing together. With Jones' death in 2012 and Tork's in 2019, Dolenz and Nesmith were left to embark on a farewell tour in 2021, finishing shortly before Nesmith's death at the end of the year.

Spurred by the success of the show, the Monkees were one of the most successful bands of the 1960s. The band sold more than 75 million records worldwide making them one of the biggest-selling groups of all time with international hits, including "Last Train to Clarksville", "I'm a Believer", "A Little Bit Me, a Little Bit You", "Pleasant Valley Sunday", and "Daydream Believer", four chart-topping albums and three chart-topping songs ("Last Train to Clarksville", "I'm a Believer", and "Daydream Believer"). Newspapers and magazines falsely reported that the Monkees outsold the Beatles and the Rolling Stones combined in 1967, a claim that originated from Nesmith in a 1977 interview.

History

Conception and casting (1962–1965) 
Aspiring filmmaker Bob Rafelson developed the initial idea for The Monkees in 1962 and tried selling it to Revue, the television division of Universal Pictures, but was unsuccessful. In May 1964, while working at Screen Gems, Rafelson teamed up with Bert Schneider, whose father, Abraham Schneider, headed the Colpix Records and Screen Gems Television units of Columbia Pictures. Rafelson and Schneider ultimately formed Raybert Productions. The Beatles' films A Hard Day's Night and Help! inspired Rafelson and Schneider to revive Rafelson's idea for The Monkees. As "The Raybert Producers", they sold the show to Screen Gems Television on April 16, 1965.

Rafelson and Schneider's original idea was to cast an existing New York folk rock group, the Lovin' Spoonful, who were not widely known at the time. However, John Sebastian had already signed the band to a record contract, which would have denied Screen Gems the right to market music from the show.

After those plans fell through, Rafelson and Schneider focused on Davy Jones who, in September 1964, had signed to a long-term contract to appear in TV programs for Screen Gems, to make feature films for Columbia Pictures and to record music for the Colpix label. His involvement with The Monkees was publicly announced on July 14, 1965, when The Hollywood Reporter stated that he was expected to return to the United States in September (after a trip to England) "to prepare for [a] TV pilot for Bert Schneider and Bob Rafelson". Jones had previously starred as the Artful Dodger in the Broadway theater show Oliver!, which debuted on December 17, 1962, and his performance was later seen on The Ed Sullivan Show the same night as the Beatles' first appearance on that show, February 9, 1964. He was nominated for a Tony Award for Best Featured Actor in a Musical in 1963.

On September 8–10, 1965, Daily Variety and The Hollywood Reporter ran an ad to cast the remainder of the band/cast members for the TV show:

Out of 437 applicants, the other three chosen for the cast of the TV show were Michael Nesmith, Peter Tork and Micky Dolenz. Nesmith had been working as a musician since early 1963 and had been recording and releasing music under various names, including Michael Blessing and "Mike & John & Bill", and he had studied drama in college. Of the final three, Nesmith was the only one who actually saw the ad in Daily Variety and The Hollywood Reporter. Tork, the last to be chosen, had been working the Greenwich Village scene as a musician and had shared the stage with Pete Seeger; he learned of The Monkees from Stephen Stills, whom Rafelson and Schneider had rejected as a songwriter. Dolenz was an actor (his father was veteran character actor George Dolenz) who had starred in the Screen Gems-produced TV series Circus Boy as a child, using the stage name Mickey Braddock. He had also played guitar and sung in a band called the Missing Links, which released one single, "Don't Do It". By that time he was using his real name; he found out about The Monkees through his agent.

In a TV interview years later, Tork stated that the last condition in the ad referred to not being under the influence of illegal substances at the time of auditioning. During his audition, Tork was asked if he smoked (cigarettes), to which he replied, "Well, I don't smoke those."

Early years (1966–1967)

Developing the music for their debut album 

During the casting process, Don Kirshner, Screen Gems' head of music, was contacted to secure music for The Monkees pilot. Kirshner's Brill Building firm Aldon Music had an extensive portfolio of songwriters, many in need of work after the British Invasion had reorganized the American music scene; while several Aldon writers contributed songs to the Monkees during their existence, the bulk of the songwriting for the group fell upon Tommy Boyce and Bobby Hart, two songwriters who were only beginning to break through to success at the time. Boyce and Hart contributed four demo recordings for the pilot. One of these recordings was "(Theme From) The Monkees" which helped get the series the green light.

When The Monkees was picked up as a series, development of the musical side of the project accelerated. Columbia-Screen Gems and RCA Victor entered into a joint venture called Colgems Records primarily to distribute Monkees records. Raybert set up a rehearsal space and rented instruments for the group to practice playing in April 1966, but it quickly became apparent they would not be in shape in time for the series debut. The producers called upon Kirshner to recruit a producer for the Monkees sessions.

Kirshner called on Snuff Garrett, composer of several hits by Gary Lewis & the Playboys, to produce the initial musical cuts for the show. Garrett, upon meeting the four Monkees in June 1966, decided that Jones would sing lead, a choice that was unpopular with the group. This cool reception led Kirshner to drop Garrett and buy out his contract. Kirshner next allowed Nesmith to produce sessions, provided he did not play on any tracks he produced. Nesmith did, however, start using the other Monkees on his sessions, particularly Tork as a guitarist. Kirshner came back to the enthusiastic Boyce and Hart to be the regular producers, but he brought in one of his top East Coast associates, Jack Keller, to lend some production experience to the sessions. Boyce and Hart observed quickly that when brought into the studio together, the four actors fooled around and tried to crack each other up. Because of this, they often brought in each singer individually.

According to Nesmith, it was Dolenz's voice that made the Monkees' sound distinctive, and even during tension-filled times Nesmith and Tork sometimes turned over lead vocal duties to Dolenz on their own compositions, such as Tork's "For Pete's Sake", which became the closing title theme for the second season of the television show.

The Monkees' debut and second albums were meant to be a soundtrack to the first season of the TV show, to cash in on the audience. In the 2006 Rhino Deluxe Edition re-issue of their second album, More of the Monkees, Mike Nesmith stated, "The first album shows up and I look at it with horror because it makes [us] appear as if we are a rock 'n' roll band. There's no credit for the other musicians. I go completely ballistic, and I say, 'What are you people thinking?' [The powers that be say], 'Well, you know, it's the fantasy.' I say, 'It's not the fantasy. You've crossed the line here! You are now duping the public. They know when they look at the television series that we're not a rock 'n' roll band; it's a show about a rock 'n' roll band. ... nobody for a minute believes that we are somehow this accomplished rock 'n' roll band that got their own television show. ... you putting the record out like this is just beyond the pale." Within a few months of their debut album, Music Supervisor Don Kirshner was forcibly dismissed and the Monkees took control as a real band.

The Monkees' first single, "Last Train to Clarksville" b/w "Take a Giant Step", was released in August 1966, just weeks prior to the TV broadcast debut. In conjunction with the first broadcast of the television show on September 12, 1966, on the NBC television network, NBC and Columbia had a major hit on their hands. The first long-playing album, The Monkees, was released a month later; it spent 13 weeks at No. 1 and stayed on the Billboard charts for 78 weeks. Twenty years later, during their reunion, it spent another 24 weeks on the Billboard charts. The album included Nesmith on lead vocals on "Papa Gene's Blues", a folk-rock and country-rock fusion that Nesmith also wrote.

Lineup configuration 

In assigning instruments for purposes of the television show, a dilemma arose as to which of the four would be the drummer. Both Nesmith (a skilled guitarist and bassist) and Tork (who could play several stringed and keyboard instruments) were peripherally familiar with the instrument but both declined to give the drum set a try. Jones knew how to play the drums and tested well enough initially on the instrument, but the producers felt that, behind a drum kit, the camera would exaggerate his short stature and make him virtually hidden from view. Thus, Dolenz (who only knew how to play the guitar) was assigned to become the drummer. Tork taught Dolenz his first few beats on the drums, enough for him to fake his way through filming the pilot, but he was soon taught how to play properly. Thus, the lineup for the TV show most frequently featured Nesmith on guitar, Tork on bass, Dolenz on drums and Jones as a frontman, singer and percussionist, although this lineup did not correspond to the members' musical strengths. Tork was a more experienced guitar player than Nesmith, while Nesmith had trained on the bass. While Jones had a strong lead voice and did sing lead on several Monkees recordings, Dolenz's voice is regarded, particularly by Nesmith, as distinctive and a hallmark of the Monkees' sound. This theoretical lineup was actually depicted once, in the music video for the band's song "Words", which shows Jones on drums, Tork playing lead guitar, Nesmith on bass and Dolenz fronting the group. In concert appearances Tork also took much of the guitar duties, even in appearances with Nesmith, and Dolenz often plays rhythm guitar on stage.

Unlike most television shows of the time, The Monkees episodes were written with many setups, requiring frequent breaks to prepare the set and cameras for short bursts of filming. Some of the "bursts" are considered proto-music videos, inasmuch as they were produced to sell the records. The Monkees Tale author Eric Lefcowitz noted that the Monkees were—first and foremost—a video group. The four actors spent 12-hour days on the set, many of them waiting for the production crew to do their jobs. Noticing that their instruments were left on the set unplugged, the four decided to turn them on and start playing.

After working on the set all day, the Monkees (usually Dolenz or Jones) would be called into the recording studio to cut vocal tracks. As the band was essential to this aspect of the recording process, there were few limits on how long they could spend in the recording studio, and the result was an extensive catalog of unreleased recordings.

Live performances and touring 
Pleased with their initial efforts, Columbia (over Kirshner's objections) planned to send the Monkees out to play live concerts. The massive success of the series—and its spin-off records—created intense pressure to mount a touring version of the group. Against the initial wishes of the producers, the band went out on the road and made their debut live performance in December 1966 in Hawaii.

They had no time to rehearse a live performance except between takes on set. They worked on the TV series all day, recorded in the studio at night and slept very little. The weekends were usually filled with special appearances or filming of special sequences. These performances were sometimes used during the actual series. The episode "Too Many Girls (Fern and Davy)" opens with a live version of "(I'm Not Your) Steppin' Stone" being performed as the scene was shot. One entire episode was filmed featuring live music. The last show of the premiere season, "Monkees on Tour", was shot in a documentary style by filming a concert in Phoenix, Arizona, on January 21, 1967. Bob Rafelson wrote and directed the episode.

In DVD commentary tracks included in the Season One release, Nesmith admitted that Tork was better at playing guitar than bass. In Tork's commentary he stated that Jones was a good drummer, and had the live performance lineups been based solely on playing ability, it should have been Tork on guitar, Nesmith on bass and Jones on drums, with Dolenz taking the fronting role. The four Monkees performed all the instruments and vocals for most of the live set. The most notable exceptions were during each member's solo sections where, during the December 1966 – May 1967 tour, they were backed by the Candy Store Prophets. During the summer, 1967 tour of the United States and the UK (from which the Live 1967 recordings are taken), they were backed by a band called the Sundowners. The Monkees toured Australia and Japan in 1968.

The results of these live performances were far better than expected. Wherever they went, the group was greeted by scenes of fan adulation reminiscent of Beatlemania. This gave the singers increased confidence in their fight for control over the musical material chosen for the series.

Kirshner and More of the Monkees 
Andrew Sandoval noted in Rhino's 2006 Deluxe Edition CD reissue of More of the Monkees that album sales were outstripping Nielsen ratings, meaning that more people were buying the music than watching the television show, prompting the producers to create more music for more albums. Sandoval also noted that their second album, More of the Monkees, propelled by their second single, "I'm a Believer" b/w "(I'm Not Your) Steppin' Stone", became the biggest-selling LP of their career, spending 70 weeks on the Billboard charts, staying No. 1 for 18 weeks, becoming the third-highest-selling album of the 1960s.  (The album also returned to the charts in 1986 for another 26 weeks.)

At the time songwriters Boyce and Hart considered the Monkees to be their project, with Tommy Boyce stating in the 2006 Rhino reissue of More of the Monkees that he considered the Monkees to be actors in the television show, while Boyce and Hart were the songwriters and producers doing the records. They wanted Micky to sing the faster songs and have Davy sing the ballads. He also stated in the liner notes that he felt that Michael's country leanings did not fit in with the Monkees' image; and, although he thought that Peter was a great musician, Peter had a different process of thinking about songs that was not right for the Monkees. Music Coordinator Kirshner, though, realizing how important the music was, wanted to move the music in a newer direction than Boyce and Hart, and so he decided to move the production to New York where his A-list of writers/producers resided.

However, the Monkees had already been complaining that the music publishing company would not allow them to play their own instruments on their records or to use more of their own material. These complaints intensified when Kirshner moved track recording from California to New York, leaving the band out of the musical process entirely until they were called upon to add their vocals to the completed tracks. Kirshner told Sandoval in 2006, "[I controlled the group] because I had a contract. I kicked them out of the studio because I had a TV show that I had to put songs in, and to me it was a business and I had to knock off the songs." Dolenz recounted to Sandoval: "To me, these were the soundtrack albums to the show, and it wasn't my job. My job was to be an actor and to come in and to sing the stuff when I was asked to do so. I had no problem with that . . . It wasn't until Mike and Peter started getting so upset that Davy and I started defending them ... they were upset because it wasn't the way they were used to making music. The artist is the bottom line. The artist decides what songs are gonna go on and in what order and who writes 'em and who produces 'em." Nesmith, when asked about the situation, in Rolling Stone magazine, said, "... We were confused, especially me. But all of us shared the desire to play the songs we were singing. Everyone was accomplished--the notion [that] I was the only musician is one of those rumors that got started and won't stop--but it was not true ... We were also kids with our own taste in music and were happier performing songs we liked--and/or wrote--than songs that were handed to us ... The [TV show's] producers [in Hollywood] backed us and David went along. None of us could have fought the battles we did [with the music publishers] without the explicit support of the show's producers." Eventually the group's efforts paid off, gaining them more participation in the recording process and laying the groundwork for Kirshner's departure.Four months after their debut single was released in September 1966, on January 16, 1967, the Monkees held their first recording session as a fully functioning, self-contained band, recording an early version of Nesmith's self-composed top 40 hit single "The Girl I Knew Somewhere", along with "All of Your Toys" and "She's So Far Out, She's In". The same month, Kirshner released their second album of songs that used session musicians, More of the Monkees, without the band's knowledge. Nesmith and Tork were particularly upset when they were on tour in January 1967 and discovered this second album. The Monkees were annoyed at not having even been told of the release in advance, at having their opinions on the track selection ignored, at Kirshner's self-congratulatory liner notes and also because of the amateurish-looking cover art, which was merely a composite of pictures of the four taken for a J.C. Penney clothing advertisement. Indeed, the Monkees had not even been given a copy of the album; they had to buy it from a record store.

The climax of the rivalry between Kirshner and the band was an intense argument among Nesmith, Kirshner and Colgems lawyer Herb Moelis, which took place at the Beverly Hills Hotel in January 1967. Kirshner had presented the group with royalty checks and gold records. Nesmith had responded with an ultimatum, demanding a change in the way the Monkees' music was chosen and recorded. Moelis reminded Nesmith that he was under contract. The confrontation ended with Nesmith punching a hole in a wall and saying, "That could have been your face!" However, each of the members, including Nesmith, accepted the $250,000 royalty checks (equivalent to approximately $ in today's funds). Kirshner was reported to have been incensed by the group's unexpected rebellion, especially when he felt they had a "modicum" of talent when compared to the superstars of the day like John Lennon and Paul McCartney.

Soon after, Colgems and the Monkees reached an agreement not to release material directly created by the group together with unrelated Kirshner-produced material. Kirshner immediately violated this agreement in early February 1967, when he released "A Little Bit Me, A Little Bit You", composed and written by Neil Diamond, as a single with an early version of "She Hangs Out", a song recorded in New York with Davy Jones' vocals, as the B-side. (This single was only released in Canada and was withdrawn after a couple of weeks.) As a result, Kirshner was fired from the project, leaving the Monkees in charge of their own musical direction.

Indeed, their musical opportunities were open beyond their ability to capitalize. Screen Gems held the publishing rights to a wealth of material, with the Monkees being offered the first choice of many new songs. Due to the abundance of material numerous tracks were recorded, but dozens were left unreleased until Rhino Records started releasing them through the Missing Links series of albums starting in the late 1980s. (A rumor persists that the Monkees were offered "Sugar, Sugar" in 1967, but declined to record it. Producer and songwriter Jeff Barry, joint writer and composer of "Sugar, Sugar" with Andy Kim, has denied this, saying that the song had not even been written at the time.)

Independence (1967–1968)

Headquarters and Pisces, Aquarius, Capricorn & Jones 
The Monkees wanted to pick the songs they sang and played on, the songs they recorded, and to be the Monkees. With Kirshner dismissed as musical supervisor, in late February 1967 Nesmith hired former Turtles bassist Douglas Farthing Hatlelid, who was better known by his stage name Chip Douglas, to produce the next Monkees album, which was to be the first Monkees album where they were the only musicians, outside of most of the bass, and the horns. Douglas was responsible for both music presentation—actually leading the band and engineering recordings—and playing bass on most of Headquarters. This album, along with their next, Pisces, Aquarius, Capricorn & Jones Ltd., served as the soundtrack to the second season of the television show.

In March 1967 "The Girl I Knew Somewhere", composed by Nesmith and performed by Dolenz, Nesmith, Tork and bassist John London, was issued as the B-side to the Monkees' third single, "A Little Bit Me, a Little Bit You", and it rose to No. 39 on the charts. The A-side rose to No. 2.

Issued in May 1967, Headquarters had no songs released as singles in the United States, but it was still their third No. 1 album in a row, with many of its songs played on the second season of the television show. Having a more country-folk-rock sound than the pop outings under Kirshner, Sandoval notes in the 2007 Deluxe Edition reissue from Rhino that the album rose to No. 1 on May 24, 1967, with the Beatles' Sgt. Pepper released the following week, which moved Headquarters to the #2 spot on the charts for the next 11 weeks—the same weeks which became known by the counterculture as the "Summer of Love". A selection that Dolenz wrote and composed, "Randy Scouse Git", was issued under the title "Alternate Title" (owing to the controversial nature of its original title) as a single internationally, where it rose to No. 2 on the charts in the UK and Norway, and in the top 10 in other parts of the world. Tork's "For Pete's Sake" was used as the closing theme for the television show. Nesmith continued in his country-rock leanings, adding the pedal steel guitar to three of the songs, along with contributing his self-composed countrified-rock song "Sunny Girlfriend". Tork added the banjo to the Nesmith-composed rocker "You Told Me", a song whose introduction was satirical of the Beatles' "Taxman". Other notable songs are the Nesmith-composed straightforward pop-rock song "You Just May Be the One" (the only track from their peak years to feature the Monkees playing the same instruments they were shown to play on the television show), used on the television series during both seasons, along with "Shades of Gray" (with piano introduction written by Tork), "Forget that Girl", and "No Time", used in the television show. The Monkees wrote five of the 12 songs on the album, plus the two tracks "Band 6" and "Zilch". The Los Angeles Times, when reviewing Headquarters, stated that "The Monkees Upgrade Album Quality" and that "The Monkees are getting better. Headquarters has more interesting songs and a better quality level [than previous albums]... None of the tracks is a throwaway... The improvement trend is laudable."

The high of Headquarters was short-lived, however. Recording and producing as a group was Tork's major interest and he hoped that the four would continue working together as a band on future recordings, according to the liner notes of the 2007 Rhino reissue of Pisces, Aquarius, Capricorn & Jones Ltd.. "Cuddly Toy" on Pisces, Aquarius, Capricorn & Jones Ltd. marked the last time Dolenz, who originally played guitar before the Monkees, made a solo stand as a studio drummer. In commentary for the DVD release of the second season of the show, Tork said that Dolenz was "incapable of repeating a triumph." Having been a drummer for one album, Dolenz lost interest in being a drummer and, indeed, he largely gave up playing instruments on Monkees recordings to session musicians like "Fast" Eddie Hoh. (Producer Chip Douglas also had identified Dolenz's drumming as the weak point in the collective musicianship of the quartet, having to splice together multiple takes of Dolenz's "shaky" drumming for final use.) By this point, the four did not have a common vision regarding their musical interests, with Nesmith and Jones also moving in different directions—Nesmith following his country/folk instincts and Jones reaching for Broadway-style numbers. The next three albums featured a diverse mixture of musical style influences, including country-rock, folk-rock, psychedelic rock, soul/R&B, guitar rock, Broadway and English music hall sensibilities.

At the height of their fame in 1967, they also suffered from a media backlash. Nesmith states in the 2007 Rhino reissue of Pisces, Aquarius, Capricorn & Jones Ltd., "Everybody in the press and in the hippie movement had got us into their target window as being illegitimate and not worthy of consideration as a musical force [or] certainly any kind of cultural force. We were under siege; wherever we went there was such resentment for us. We were constantly mocked and humiliated by the press. We were really gettin' beat up pretty good. We all knew what was going on inside. Kirshner had been purged. We'd gone to try to make Headquarters and found out that it was only marginally okay and that our better move was to just go back to the original songwriting and song-making strategy of the first albums except with a clear indication of how [the music] came to be... The rabid element and the hatred that was engendered is almost impossible to describe. It lingers to this day among people my own age." Tork disagreed with Nesmith's assessment of Headquarters, stating, "I don't think the Pisces album was as groovy to listen to as Headquarters. Technically it was much better, but I think it suffers for that reason."

With Pisces, Aquarius, Capricorn & Jones Ltd., the Monkees' fourth album, they went back to making music for the television show, except that they had control over the music and which songs would be chosen. They used a mixture of themselves and session musicians on the album, including the Wrecking Crew, Louie Shelton, Glen Campbell, members of the Byrds and the Association, drummer "Fast" Eddie Hoh, Lowell George, Stephen Stills, Buddy Miles, and Neil Young—a practice that continued for all their studio albums except Justus.

Using Chip Douglas again to produce, Pisces, Aquarius, Capricorn & Jones Ltd., released in November 1967 was the Monkees' fourth No. 1 album in a row, staying at No. 1 for 5 weeks, and was also their last No. 1 album. It featured the hit single "Pleasant Valley Sunday" (#3 on charts) b/w "Words" (#11 on charts), the A-side had Nesmith on electric guitar/backing vocals, Tork on piano/backing vocals, Dolenz on lead vocals and possibly guitar and Jones on backing vocals; the B-side had Micky and Peter alternating lead vocals, Peter played organ, Mike played guitar, percussion, and provided backing vocals, and Davy provided percussion and backing vocals. Other notable items about this album is that it features an early use of the Moog synthesizer on two tracks, the Nesmith-penned "Daily Nightly", along with "Star Collector". All of its songs, except for two, were featured on the Monkees' television show during the second season.

The song "What Am I Doing Hangin' 'Round?", recorded in June 1967 and featured on Pisces, Aquarius, Capricorn & Jones Ltd., is seen as a landmark in the fusion of country and rock despite Nesmith's prior country-flavored rock songs for the Monkees. Nesmith stated, "One of the things that I really felt was honest was country-rock. I wanted to move the Monkees more into that because ... if we get closer to country music, we'll get closer to blues, and country blues, and so forth. ... It had a lot of un-country things in it: a familiar change from a I major to a VI minor—those kinds of things. So it was a little kind of a new wave country song. It didn't sound like the country songs of the time, which was Buck Owens."

Their next single, "Daydream Believer" (with a piano intro written by Tork), shot to No. 1 on the charts, letting the Monkees hold the No. 1 position in the singles chart and the album chart with Pisces simultaneously. "Daydream Believer" used the non-album track "Goin' Down" as its B-side, which featured Nesmith and Tork on guitar with Micky on lead vocals.

During their 1986 reunion, both Headquarters and Pisces, Aquarius, Capricorn & Jones Ltd. returned to the charts for 17 weeks.

The Birds, The Bees & The Monkees 

No longer desiring to work as a group, the Monkees dropped Chip Douglas as a producer, and starting in November 1967, they largely produced their own sessions. Although credited to the whole band, the songs were mostly solo efforts. In a couple of cases, Boyce and Hart had returned from the first two albums to produce, but credit was given to the Monkees due to contractual requirements.

Propelled by the hit singles "Daydream Believer" and "Valleri", along with Nesmith's self-penned top 40 hit "Tapioca Tundra", The Birds, The Bees & The Monkees reached No. 3 on the Billboard charts shortly after it was released in April 1968. It was the first album released after NBC announced they were not renewing The Monkees for a third season. The album cover—a quaint collage of items in a knickknack shelf—was chosen over the Monkees' objections. It was the last Monkees' album to be released in separate, dedicated mono and stereo mixes. During the 1986 reunion, it returned to the Billboard charts for 11 weeks.

Beyond television and Head 

During the filming of the second season, the band became tired of scripts which they deemed monotonous and stale. They had already succeeded in eliminating the laugh track (a then-standard on American sitcoms), with the bulk of Season 2 episodes airing minus the canned chuckles. They proposed switching the format of the series to become more like a variety show, with musical guests and live performances. This desire was partially fulfilled within some second-season episodes, with guest stars like musicians Frank Zappa, Tim Buckley, and Charlie Smalls (composer of The Wiz) performing on the show. However, NBC was not interested in eliminating the existing format, and the group (except for Peter) had little desire to continue for a third season. Tork said in DVD commentary that everyone had developed such difficult personalities that the big-name stars invited as guests on the show invariably left the experience "hating everybody".

Screen Gems and NBC went ahead with the existing format anyway, commissioning Monkees writers Gerald Gardner and Dee Caruso to create a straight-comedy, no-music half-hour in the Monkees mold; a pilot episode was filmed with the then-popular nightclub act the Pickle Brothers. The pilot had the same energy and pace of The Monkees, but never became a series.

In June 1968, Music Supervisor Lester Sill chose to release the two non-album tracks "D.W. Washburn" b/w "It's Nice To Be With You" as the Monkees' next single. The Leiber/Stoller-penned A-side broke into the Top 20, peaking at No. 19 on the charts and No. 2 on the Canadian RPM charts.

After The Monkees was canceled in February 1968, Rafelson directed the four Monkees in a feature film, Head. Schneider was executive producer, and the project was co-written and co-produced by Bob Rafelson with a then-relatively unknown Jack Nicholson.

The film, conceived and edited in a stream of consciousness style, featured oddball cameo appearances by movie stars Victor Mature, Annette Funicello, a young Teri Garr, boxer Sonny Liston, famous stripper Carol Doda, Green Bay Packers linebacker Ray Nitschke, and musician Frank Zappa. It was filmed at Columbia Pictures' Screen Gems studios and on location in California, Utah, and the Bahamas between February 19 and May 17, 1968, and premiered in New York City on November 6 of that year (the film later debuted in Hollywood on November 20).

The film was not a commercial success, in part because it was the antithesis of The Monkees television show, intended to comprehensively demolish the group's carefully groomed public image. Rafelson and Nicholson's "Ditty Diego-War Chant" (recited at the start of the film by the group) ruthlessly parodies Boyce and Hart's "Monkees Theme". A sparse advertising campaign (with no mention of the Monkees) hurt any chances of the film doing well, and it played briefly in half-filled theaters. In the DVD commentary, Nesmith said that everyone associated with the Monkees "had gone crazy" by this time. They were each using the platform of the Monkees to push their own disparate career goals, to the detriment of the Monkees project. Nesmith added that Head was Rafelson and Nicholson's intentional effort to "kill" the Monkees, so that they would no longer be bothered with the matter. Indeed, Rafelson and Schneider severed all ties to the band amid the bitterness that ensued over the commercial failure of Head. At the time, Rafelson told the press, "I grooved on those four in very special ways while at the same time thinking they had absolutely no talent."

Released in October 1968, the single from the album, "The Porpoise Song", is a psychedelic pop song written by Goffin and King, with lead vocals from Micky Dolenz and backing vocals from Davy Jones, and it reached No. 62 on the Billboard charts and No. 26 on the Canadian RPM charts.

The soundtrack album to the movie, Head, reached No. 45 on the Billboard charts and No. 24 in Canada. Jack Nicholson assembled the film's soundtrack album, weaving dialogue and sound effects from the film in between the songs from the film. The six (plus "Ditty Diego") Monkees songs on the album range from psychedelic pop to straightforward rockers to Broadway rock to eastern-influenced pop to a folk-rock ballad. Although the Monkees performed "Circle Sky" live in the film, the studio version is chosen for the soundtrack album. The live version was later released on various compilations, including Rhino's Missing Links series of Monkees albums. The soundtrack album also includes a song from the film's composer, Ken Thorne. The album had a mylar cover, to give it a mirror-like appearance, so that the person looking at the cover would see his own head, a play on the album title Head. Peter Tork said, "That was something special... [Jack] Nicholson coordinated the record, made it up from the soundtrack. He made it different from the movie. There's a line in the movie where [Frank] Zappa says, 'That's pretty white.' Then there's another line in the movie that was not juxtaposed in the movie, but Nicholson put them together in the [soundtrack album], when Mike says, 'And the same thing goes for Christmas'... that's funny... very different from the movie... that was very important and wonderful that he assembled the record differently from the movie... It was a different artistic experience."

Over the intervening years Head has developed a cult following for its innovative style and anarchic humor. Members of the Monkees, Nesmith in particular, cite the soundtrack album as one of the crowning achievements of the band.

Later years and separation (1969–1971)

Tork's resignation, Instant Replay and The Monkees Present 
Tensions within the group were increasing. Peter Tork, citing exhaustion, quit by buying out the last four years of his Monkees contract at $150,000 per year, equal to about $ per year today. This was shortly after the band's Far East tour in December 1968, after completing work on their 1969 NBC television special, 33⅓ Revolutions Per Monkee, which rehashed many of the ideas from Head, only with the Monkees playing a strangely second-string role. In the DVD commentary for the television special, Dolenz noted that after filming was complete, Nesmith gave Tork a gold watch as a going-away present, engraved "From the guys down at work." (Tork kept the back, but replaced the watch several times in later years.) Most of the songs from the 33 1/3 Revolutions Per Monkee TV Special were not officially released until over 40 years later, on the 2010 and 2011 Rhino Handmade Deluxe boxed sets of Head and Instant Replay.

Since the Monkees at this point were producing their own songs with very little of the other band members' involvement, they planned a future double album (eventually to be reduced to The Monkees Present) on which each Monkee would separately produce one side of a disc.

In February 1969, the Monkees' seventh album, Instant Replay, without Tork's involvement beyond playing guitar on "I Won't Be the Same Without Her", was released, which reached No. 32 on the charts. and No. 45 in Canada. The single from the album was "Tear Drop City", which peaked at No. 56 on the U.S. Billboard chart, No. 27 on the Canadian chart, and No. 34 on the Australian chart. According to Rhino Handmade's 2011 Deluxe Edition reissue of this album, Davy Jones told Melody Maker, "Half of the songs were recorded over the last three years, but there are also about six new ones." The Monkees wanted to please the original 1966 fans by offering up new recordings of some previously unreleased older styled songs, as well as gain a new audience with what they considered a more mature sound. Nesmith continued in his country-rock vein after offering straight ahead rock and experimental songs on the two prior albums. Nesmith stated in Rhino Handmade's 2011 Deluxe Edition reissue, "I guess it was the same embryo beating in me that was somewhere in Don Henley and Glenn Frey and Linda Ronstadt and Neil Young. Everybody who was hanging out in those times. I could just feel this happening that there was this thing. So, I headed off to Nashville to see if I couldn't get some of the Nashville country thing into the rock 'n' roll or vice versa. What I found was that Nashville country was not the country that was going to be the basis of country-rock and that it was Western, Southwest country. It was coming much more out of the Southern California scene. I ended up with a lot of Dobro, mandolin, banjo, and things that were hard-core mountain music stuff ... the Nashville cats were so blown out by playin' this kind of music. They loved it, for one thing."

Dolenz contributed the biggest and longest Monkees' production, "Shorty Blackwell", a song inspired by his cat of the same name. Dolenz called it his "feeble attempt at something to do with Sgt. Pepper." Jones contributed an electric guitar rocker, "You and I". Both Jones and Dolenz continued their role of singing on the pop songs. Lyrically, it has a theme of being one of the Monkees' most melancholy albums.

Throughout 1969 the trio appeared as guests on television programs such as The Glen Campbell Goodtime Hour, The Johnny Cash Show, Hollywood Squares, and Laugh-In (Jones had also appeared on Laugh-In separate from the group). The Monkees also had a contractual obligation to appear in several television commercials with Bugs Bunny for Kool-Aid drink mix as well as Post cereal box singles.

In April 1969, the single "Someday Man" b/w "Listen to the Band" was released, which had the unique distinction of the B-side, a Nesmith composed country-rock song, charting higher (No. 63) than the Jones-sung A-side (No. 81). In Canada, "Someday Man" was No. 74 and "Listen to the Band" reached No. 53.

The final album with Michael Nesmith from the Monkees' original incarnation was their eighth album, The Monkees Present, released in October 1969, which peaked at No. 100 on the Billboard charts. It included the Nesmith composed country-rock singles "Listen to the Band" and "Good Clean Fun" (released in September 1969)(No. 80 Canada) Other notable songs include the Dolenz composition "Little Girl", which featured Louie Shelton on electric guitar, joining Micky on acoustic guitar, along with "Mommy and Daddy" (B-side to the "Good Clean Fun" single) in which he sang about America's treatment of the Native Americans and drug abuse, and in an earlier take, released on Rhino Handmade's 2011 Deluxe Edition of Instant Replay, sang about JFK's assassination and the Vietnam war. Jones collaborated with Bill Chadwick on some slower ballads, along with releasing a couple of older upbeat songs from 1966.

In the summer of 1969 the three Monkees embarked on a tour with the backing of the soul band Sam and the Goodtimers. Concerts for this tour were longer sets than their earlier performances tours, with many shows running over two hours. Although the tour was met with some positive critical reception (Billboard in particular praised it), other critics were not favorable of the mixing of the Monkees' pop music with the Goodtimers' R&B approach. Toward the end of the tour, some dates were canceled due to poor ticket sales, and the tour failed to re-establish the band commercially, with no single entering the Top 40 in 1969. Dolenz remarked that the tour "was like kicking a dead horse. The phenomenon had peaked."

Nesmith's resignation, Changes and disbandment 
On April 14, 1970, Nesmith joined Dolenz and Jones for the last time as part of the original incarnation of the Monkees to film a Kool-Aid commercial (with the then-newly introduced Nerf balls, thrown around a mock living room by the trio, available as a premium for Kool-Aid labels), with Nesmith leaving the group to continue recording songs with his own country-rock group called Michael Nesmith & The First National Band, which he had started recording with on February 10, 1970. His first album, Magnetic South, was released in June, 1970. At the time he left the Monkees in April, he was recording songs for his second, Loose Salute.

This left Dolenz and Jones to record the bubblegum pop album Changes as the ninth and final album by the Monkees released during its original incarnation. By this time, Colgems was hardly putting any effort into the project, and they sent Dolenz and Jones to New York for the Changes sessions, to be produced by Jeff Barry. In comments for the liner notes of the 1994 re-release of Changes, Jones said that he felt they had been tricked into recording an "Andy Kim album" under the Monkees name. Except for the two singers' vocal performances, Changes is the only album that fails to win any significant praise from critics looking back 40 years to the Monkees' recording output. The album spawned the single "Oh My My", which was accompanied by a music film promo (produced/directed by Dolenz). Dolenz contributed one of his own compositions, "Midnight Train", which was used in the re-runs of the Monkees TV series. The "Oh My My" b/w "I Love You Better" single from the Changes album was the last single issued under the Monkees name in the United States until 1986. Originally released in June 1970, Changes first charted in Billboard's Top 200 during the Monkees' 1986 reunion, staying on the charts for 4 weeks.

September 22, 1970 marked the final recording session by the Monkees in their original incarnation, when Jones and Dolenz recorded "Do It in the Name of Love" and "Lady Jane". Not mixed until February 19, 1971, and released later that year as a single, the two remaining Monkees then lost the rights to use the name in several countries, the U.S. included. The single was not credited to the Monkees in the U.S., but to a misspelled "Mickey Dolenz and Davy Jones", although in Japan it was issued under the Monkees' name.

Jones released a solo album in 1971, titled Davy Jones, featuring the single "Rainy Jane" / "Welcome to My Love". Both Jones and Dolenz released multiple singles as solo artists in the years following the original breakup of the Monkees. The duo continued to tour throughout most of the 1970s.

Reunions and revivals (1976–2021)

Dolenz, Jones, Boyce & Hart 
Partly because of repeats of the television series The Monkees on Saturday mornings and in syndication, The Monkees Greatest Hits charted in 1976. The LP, issued by Arista Records, who by this time had possession of the Monkees' master tapes, courtesy of their corporate owner, Screen Gems, was actually a re-packaging of an earlier (1972) compilation LP called Refocus that had been issued by Arista's previous label imprint, Bell Records, also owned by Screen Gems. Dolenz and Jones took advantage of this, joining ex-Monkees songwriters Tommy Boyce and Bobby Hart to tour the United States. From 1975 to 1977, as the "Golden Hits of the Monkees" show ("The Guys who Wrote 'Em and the Guys who Sang 'Em!"), they successfully performed in smaller venues such as state fairs and amusement parks, as well as making stops in Japan, Thailand, Hong Kong and Singapore. They also released an album of new material as Dolenz, Jones, Boyce & Hart. Nesmith had not been interested in a reunion. Tork claimed later that he had not been asked, although a Christmas single (credited to Micky Dolenz, Davy Jones and Peter Tork due to legal reasons) was produced by Chip Douglas and released on his own label in 1976. The single featured Douglas' and Howard Kaylan's "Christmas Is My Time of Year" (originally recorded by a 1960s group Christmas Spirit), with a B-side of Irving Berlin's "White Christmas" (Douglas released a remixed version of the single, with additional overdubbed instruments, in 1986). This was the first (albeit unofficial) Monkees single since 1971. Tork also joined Dolenz, Jones, Boyce & Hart on stage at Disneyland in Anaheim, California on July 4, 1976, and also joined Dolenz and Jones on stage at the Starwood in Hollywood in 1977.

Other semi-reunions occurred between 1970 and 1986. Tork helped produce a Dolenz single, "Easy on You"/"Oh Someone" in 1971. Tork also recorded some unreleased tracks for Nesmith's Countryside label during the 1970s, and Dolenz (by then a successful television director in the United Kingdom) directed a segment of Nesmith's TV series Television Parts, although his segment was ultimately not included when the series' six episodes were broadcast by NBC during the summer of 1985.

MTV and Nickelodeon reignite Monkeemania 
Brushed off by critics during their heyday in the late 1960s as manufactured and lacking talent, the Monkees experienced a critical and commercial renaissance two decades later. A Monkees TV show marathon ("Pleasant Valley Sunday") was broadcast on February 23, 1986, on the then five-year-old MTV video music channel. In February and March, Tork and Jones played together in Australia. Then in May, Dolenz, Jones, and Tork announced a "20th Anniversary Tour" produced by David Fishof and they began playing North America in June. Their original albums began selling again as Nickelodeon began to run their old series daily. MTV promotion also helped to resurrect a smaller version of Monkeemania, and tour dates grew from smaller to larger venues and became one of the biggest live acts of 1986 and 1987. A new greatest hits collection was issued, reaching platinum status.

By this point, Nesmith was more amenable to a reunion, but forced to sit out most projects because of prior commitments to his Pacific Arts video production company. However, he did appear with the band in a 1986 Christmas medley music video for MTV, and appeared on stage with Dolenz, Jones, and Tork at the Greek Theatre, in Los Angeles, on September 7, 1986. In September 1988, the three rejoined to play Australia again, Europe and then North America, with that string of tours ending in September 1989. Nesmith again returned at the Universal Amphitheatre, Los Angeles, show on July 10, 1989, and took part in a dedication ceremony at the Hollywood Walk of Fame, when the Monkees received a TV star there in 1989.

The sudden revival of the Monkees in 1986 helped move the first official Monkees single since 1971, "That Was Then, This Is Now", to the No. 20 position in Billboard Magazine. The success, however, was not without controversy. Jones had declined to sing on the track, recorded along with two other new songs included in a compilation album, Then & Now... The Best of The Monkees. Some copies of the single and album credit the new songs to "the Monkees", others as "Micky Dolenz and Peter Tork (of the Monkees)". Reportedly, these recordings were the source of some personal friction between Jones and the others during the 1986 tour; Jones typically left the stage when the new songs were performed. However, Jones did participate in the follow-up album, 1987's Pool It!.

New Monkees 

In 1987, a new television series called New Monkees appeared. Other than being centered around a boy band quartet, it bore no resemblance to the earlier series or group. The New Monkees left the air after 13 episodes. (Bob Rafelson and Bert Schneider were involved in the production of the series, although it was primarily produced by "Straybert Productions" headed by Steve Blauner, Rafelson and Schneider's partner in BBS Productions.)

1990s reunions 
In the 1990s, the Monkees continued to record new material. The band also re-issued all the original LPs on CD, each of which included between three and six bonus tracks of previously unreleased songs or alternate takes; the first editions came with collectable trading cards.

Dolenz, Jones and Tork appeared in a 1995 episode of Boy Meets World, but not as themselves; Tork appeared in two episodes as Topanga Lawrence's father Jedediah. The trio also appeared together, as themselves, in the 1995 film The Brady Bunch Movie.

Their eleventh album Justus was released in 1996. It was the first since 1968 on which all four original members performed and produced. Justus was produced by the Monkees, all songs were written by one of the four Monkees, and it was recorded using only the four Monkees for all instruments and vocals, which was the inspiration for the album title and spelling (Justus = Just Us).

The trio of Dolenz, Jones, and Tork reunited again for a successful 30th anniversary tour of American amphitheaters in 1996, while Nesmith joined them onstage in Los Angeles to promote the new songs from Justus. For the first time since the brief 1986 reunion, Nesmith returned to the concert stage for a tour of the United Kingdom in 1997, highlighted by two sold-out concerts at Wembley Arena in Wembley Park, London. This was a very fitting venue, as from 30 June to 2 July 1967 the Monkees had been the first group to headline on their own at the Empire Pool, as the Arena was then called.

The full quartet also appeared in an ABC television special titled Hey, Hey, It's the Monkees, which was written and directed by Nesmith and spoofed the original series that had made them famous. Following the UK tour, Nesmith declined to continue future performances with the Monkees, having faced harsh criticism from the British music press for his deteriorating musicianship. Tork noted in DVD commentary that "In 1966, Nesmith had learned a reasonably good version of the famous 'Last Train to Clarksville' guitar lick, but in 1996, Mike was no longer able to play it" and so Tork took over the lead guitar parts.

Nesmith's departure from the tour was acrimonious. Jones was quoted by the Los Angeles Times as complaining that Nesmith "made a new album with us. He toured Great Britain with us. Then all of a sudden, he's not here. Later, I hear rumors he's writing a script for our next movie. Oh, really? That's bloody news to me. He's always been this aloof, inaccessible person... the fourth part of the jigsaw puzzle that never quite fit in."

2000s reunions 
Tork, Jones, and Dolenz toured the United States in 1997, after which the group took another hiatus until 2001 when they once again reunited to tour the United States. However, this tour was also accompanied by public sniping. Dolenz and Jones had announced that they had "fired" Tork for his constant complaining and threatening to quit. Tork was quoted as confirming this, as well as stating that he wanted to tour with his own band, Shoe Suede Blues. Tork told WENN News he was troubled by the overindulgence in alcohol by other members of the tour crew:

Micky Dolenz and Davy Jones fired me just before the last two shows of our 35th anniversary tour. I'm both happy and sad over the whole thing. I always loved the work onstage—but I just couldn't handle the backstage problems. I'd given them 30 days notice that I was leaving so my position is that I resigned first and then they dropped me. Thank God I don't need the Monkees anymore...I'm a recovering alcoholic and haven't had a drink in several years. I'm not against people drinking—just when they get mean and abusive. I went on the anniversary tour with the agreement that I didn't have to put up with drinking and difficult behavior offstage. When things weren't getting better, I gave the guys notice that I was leaving in 30 days for good.

Tork later stated in 2011 that the alcohol played only a small role and Tork then said, "I take full responsibility for the backstage problems on the 2001 tour. We were getting along pretty well until I had a meltdown. I ticked the other guys off good and proper and it was a serious mistake on my part. I was not in charge of myself to the best of my ability – the way I hope I have become since. I really just behaved inappropriately, honestly. I apologized to them."

Jones and Dolenz went on to tour the United Kingdom in 2002, but Tork declined to participate. Jones and Dolenz toured the United States one more time as a duo in 2002, and then split to concentrate on their own individual projects. With different Monkees citing different reasons, the group chose not to mark their 40th anniversary in 2006.

2010–2011: 45th anniversary tour and Jones' death 
In October 2010, Jones stated that a reunion marking the band's 45th anniversary was a possibility. Monkees biographer Andrew Sandoval commented in The Hollywood Reporter that he "spent three years cajoling them to look beyond their recent differences (which included putting aside solo projects to fully commit to the Monkees)."
An Evening with The Monkees: The 45th Anniversary Tour commenced on May 12, 2011, in Liverpool, England, before moving to North America in June and July for a total of 43 performances. Sandoval noted, "Their mixed feelings on the music business and their long and winding relationship weighed heavily, but once they hit the stage, the old magic was apparent. For the next three months...[they brought] the music and memories to fans in the band's grandest stage show in decades. Images from their series and films flashed on a huge screen behind them; even Rolling Stone, whose owner, Jann Wenner, has vowed to keep them out of the Rock and Roll Hall of Fame, gushed." Nesmith did not take part in the tour, which grossed approximately $4 million.

On August 8, 2011, the band canceled ten last-minute shows due to what was initially reported as "internal group issues and conflicts", though Tork later confirmed "there were some business affairs that couldn't be coordinated correctly. We hit a glitch and there was just this weird dislocation at one point." Jones clarified that "the (45th Anniversary) tour was only supposed to go until July. And it was great, the best time we've had because we're all on the same page now. We jelled onstage and off. But then more dates were being added. And more. And then the next thing we knew, they were talking about Japan, Australia, Brazil, and we were like, 'Wait a second. This is turning into something more than a tour.' We were doing 40 songs a night, plus other material. Some of these shows were 2 hours long. Then there was the travel, getting to the next venue with no time to revive. The audiences were great. But, let's face it, we're not kids."

The 45th anniversary tour was the last with Jones, who died of a heart attack at age 66 on February 29, 2012.

2012–2014: Reunion with Nesmith 
In the wake of Jones' death, rumors began to circulate that Nesmith would reunite with Dolenz and Tork. This was confirmed on August 8, 2012, when the surviving trio announced a series of U.S. shows for November and December, commencing in Escondido, California and concluding in New York City. The brief tour marked the first time Nesmith performed with the Monkees since 1997, as well as the first without Jones. Jones's memory was honored throughout the shows via recordings and video. During one point, the band went quiet and a recording of Jones singing "I Wanna Be Free" played while footage of him was screening behind the band. For Jones's signature song, "Daydream Believer", Dolenz said that the band had discussed who should sing the song and had concluded that it should be the fans, saying "It doesn't belong to us anymore. It belongs to you."

The Fall 2012 tour was very well received by both fans and critics, resulting in the band's scheduling a 24-date summer tour for 2013. Dubbed "A Midsummer’s Night With the Monkees", concerts also featured Nesmith, Dolenz, and Tork. "The reaction to the last tour was euphoric", Dolenz told Rolling Stone magazine. "It was pretty apparent there was a demand for another one." A third tour with Nesmith followed in 2014.

In 2014, the Monkees were inducted into the Pop Music Hall of Fame at the 2014 Monkees Convention. At the convention the band announced a 2014 tour of the Eastern and Midwestern US.

2015–2017: Good Times! and 50th anniversary 
Dolenz and Tork toured as the Monkees in 2015 without Nesmith's participation. Nesmith stated that he was busy with other ventures, although Dolenz said that "He's always invited." In February 2016, Dolenz announced that the Monkees would be releasing a new album, titled Good Times!, as a celebration of their 50th anniversary. Good Times!, produced by Adam Schlesinger of Fountains of Wayne, features contributions by all three surviving members, as well as a posthumous contribution from Jones through vocals he had recorded in the 60s. The album was released in May 2016 to considerable success, reaching No. 14 on the Billboard 200 and generally favorable reviews.

With the release of the album, the band, featuring Dolenz and Tork, commenced their 50th anniversary tour. Nesmith did not participate in most of the tour, again citing other commitments. He did, however, make a few appearances throughout the summer of 2016, appearing virtually via Skype to perform "Papa Gene's Blues" at one concert and in person for a four-song encore at another. In September, he replaced Tork on the tour for two dates while Tork attended to a family emergency. After Tork returned to the tour, Nesmith performed with the band for a concert at the Pantages Theatre in Hollywood on September 16, which he stated would likely be his final concert appearance with the Monkees. Dolenz and Tork's tour announced dates to the end of the year, including concerts in Australia and New Zealand.

After the end of the 50th anniversary tour, Dolenz, Tork, and Nesmith spent 2017 engaging in solo activities.

2018–2021: The Mike and Micky Show, Christmas Party, Tork's death, farewell tour, and Nesmith's death 
In 2018, Nesmith toured with a revived version of the First National Band and stated that he was in negotiations with promoters to tour again with Dolenz later in the summer. On February 20, the tour was announced as "The Monkees Present: The Mike and Micky Show", their first tour as a duo; Tork declined to participate. Though the pair played Monkees music and promoted the tour under the Monkees banner, Nesmith stated that "there's no pretense there about Micky and I being the Monkees. We're not."

The tour was cut short in June 2018, with four shows left unplayed, due to Nesmith having a health issue. He and Dolenz announced March 2019 as make-up dates for the missed shows. In an interview with Rolling Stone published on July 26, 2018, Nesmith revealed he had undergone quadruple bypass heart surgery. He was in the hospital for over a month and the health issue had persisted since early in the tour. Nesmith resumed live touring with his First National Band Redux shows in September 2018. In November 2018, Nesmith and Dolenz announced an additional eight shows had been added to the Mike and Micky Show tour. In June 2019, Nesmith and Dolenz toured the Mike and Micky Show in Australia and New Zealand.

The Monkees released a Christmas album, Christmas Party, on October 12, 2018. The Adam Schlesinger-produced album features several holiday standards and new songwriting contributions from Andy Partridge, Scott McCaughey, Peter Buck, Rivers Cuomo and author Michael Chabon. In addition to newly recorded material from the three surviving Monkees, two songs feature vocals from Davy Jones. The cover art is provided by the comic book artists Mike and Laura Allred.

Tork died of cancer on February 21, 2019. After Tork's death, Dolenz and Nesmith revealed that Tork had informed them that he would not be well enough to join them on tour, which led Dolenz and Nesmith to demand that the Mike and Mickey Show dates in 2018 were a separate duo, and not Monkees dates without Tork. However, after Tork's death, all future dates were credited to the Monkees.

Following the success of the Mike and Micky Show, Dolenz and Nesmith announced a follow-up tour, An Evening with the Monkees, to begin in early 2020. The tour was delayed, however, due the COVID-19 pandemic. It was announced on May 4, 2021, that the rescheduled dates will be billed as a farewell tour. "The Monkees Farewell Tour" consisted of over 40 dates in the US from September to November; because of restrictions due to the ongoing COVID-19 pandemic, they were unable to play shows in Canada, the UK or Australia. The final date and final show for the Monkees Farewell Tour was held on November 14, 2021, at the Greek Theatre in Los Angeles.

In interviews, Dolenz did not rule out the possibility of the duo playing future one-off dates after the tour had concluded. However, he emphasized that as both members of the duo would be rapidly approaching their eighties by 2022–2023, the physical demands of touring meant that the Monkees would not be mounting any further tours after 2021. The duo had been scheduled to perform at least one more traditional concert (postponed due to coronavirus regulations) as well as perform on a cruise headlined Mike Love and Bruce Johnston of The Beach Boys, the latter of which Dolenz agreed to honor as part of his subsequent solo tour.

In May 2021, Dolenz released a solo album, Dolenz Sings Nesmith, featuring songs written by Nesmith and produced by Christian Nesmith.

Nesmith died of heart failure on December 10, 2021, less than a month after the final date of the 2021 tour. Nesmith's passing leaves Dolenz as the only surviving member of the Monkees. Tributes to Nesmith from other musicians, fans, and Dolenz were posted on social media.

Micky Dolenz (2022–present)

2022: "The Monkees Celebrated by Micky Dolenz" tour 

In early 2022, Dolenz announced that he would embark on a "special series of concert dates in April 2022. Honoring the contributions of his bandmates – the late Davy Jones, Mike Nesmith & Peter Tork – in song and with personal multimedia footage of the legendary performers". Monkees manager and tour manager Andrew Sandoval stated that "We will be fully delving into The Monkees' songbook, as well as Micky's personal archive of films and photos to create a unique evening of memories ... It will give Micky and the band an opportunity to share the music he made alongside Davy, Peter & Michael and reminisce on their journey as brothers for five decades. We have also been talking about Micky singing some songs he's never done on stage before, as well as pulling out older Monkees album tracks that have not been performed in many years ... it is unclear if we will be doing anything beyond these shows in this format, but we are truly looking forward to being together again to celebrate the Monkees in song." The official tour was set to start on April 5, 2022, with a pre-tour performance on "The Beach Boys Good Vibrations Cruise".

Impact and legacy
The Monkees, selected specifically to appeal to the youth market as American television's response to the Beatles with their manufactured personae and carefully produced singles, are seen as an original precursor to the modern proliferation of studio and corporation-created bands. But this critical reputation has softened somewhat, with the recognition that the Monkees were neither the first manufactured group nor unusual in this respect. The Monkees also frequently contributed their own songwriting efforts on their albums and saw their musical skills improve. They ultimately became a self-directed group, playing their own instruments and writing many of their own songs.

Monkees and 1960s music historian Andrew Sandoval wrote in The Hollywood Reporter

The Chicago Tribune interviewed Davy Jones, who said, "We touched a lot of musicians, you know. I can't tell you the amount of people that have come up and said, 'I wouldn't have been a musician if it hadn't been for the Monkees.' It baffles me even now", Jones added. "I met a guy from Guns N' Roses, and he was overwhelmed by the meeting, and was just so complimentary."

The Monkees found unlikely fans among musicians of the punk rock period of the mid-1970s. Many of these punk performers had grown up on TV reruns of the series, and sympathized with the anti-industry, anti-establishment trend of their career. Sex Pistols and Minor Threat both recorded versions of "(I'm Not Your) Steppin' Stone" and it was often played live by Toy Love. Japanese new wave pop group the Plastics recorded a synthesizer and drum-machine version of "Last Train to Clarksville" for their 1979 album Welcome Back.

Glenn A. Baker, author of Monkeemania: The True Story of the Monkees, described the Monkees as "rock's first great embarrassment" in 1986:

Like an illegitimate child in a respectable family, the Monkees are destined to be regarded forever as rock's first great embarrassment; misunderstood and maligned like a mongrel at a ritzy dog show, or a test tube baby at the Vatican. The rise of the pre-fab four coincided with rock's desperate desire to cloak itself with the trappings of respectability, credibility and irreproachable heritage. The fact was ignored that session players were being heavily employed by the Beach Boys, the Beatles, the Mamas and the Papas, the Byrds and other titans of the age. However, what could not be ignored, as rock disdained its pubescent past, was a group of middle-aged Hollywood businessmen had actually assembled their concept of a profitable rock group and foisted it upon the world. What mattered was that the Monkees had success handed to them on a silver plate. Indeed, it was not so much righteous indignation but thinly disguised jealousy which motivated the scornful dismissal of what must, in retrospect, be seen as entertaining, imaginative and highly memorable exercise in pop culture.

Mediaite columnist Paul Levinson noted that "The Monkees were the first example of something created in a medium—in this case, a rock group on television—that jumped off the screen to have big impact in the real world."

When commenting on the death of Jones on February 29, 2012, Time magazine contributor James Poniewozik praised the television show, saying that

... even if the show never meant to be more than entertainment and a hit-single generator, we shouldn't sell The Monkees short. It was far better TV than it had to be; during an era of formulaic domestic sitcoms and wacky comedies, it was a stylistically ambitious show, with a distinctive visual style, absurdist sense of humor and unusual story structure. Whatever Jones and the Monkees were meant to be, they became creative artists in their own right, and Jones' chipper Brit-pop presence was a big reason they were able to produce work that was commercial, wholesome and yet impressively weird.

Both the style and substance of the Monkees were imitated by American boy band Big Time Rush (BTR), who performed in their own television series which—by admission of series creator Scott Fellows—was heavily influenced by the Monkees. Similarly to the Monkees, Big Time Rush featured a "made-for-tv" boy band often caught in a series of misadventures, hijinks, and somewhat slapstick comedy. The show, now in reruns but still hugely popular on Teen Nick, is highly stylized and patterned after the Monkees, even capped with similar cartoonish sound effects. Like the Monkees, BTR has also seen critical and commercial success in America and worldwide through album, singles and high TV ratings worldwide."

In popular culture
The Criterion Collection, which has a stated goal to release "a continuing series of important classic and contemporary films, [and] has been dedicated to gathering the greatest films from around the world and publishing them in editions that offer the highest technical quality and award-winning, original supplements" recognized the Monkees' film Head as meeting their criteria when they fully restored and released it on DVD and Blu-ray in 2010. They stated that Head was "way, way ahead of its time" and "arguably the most authentically psychedelic film made in 1960s Hollywood". Head dodged commercial success on its release but has since been reclaimed as one of the great cult objects of its era."

In the book Hey, Hey We're The Monkees, Rafelson wrote that "[Head] explored techniques on film that hadn't been used before. The first shot of Micky under water is a perfect example. Now you see it on MTV all the time, but it was invented for the movie [...] I got two long-haired kids out of UCLA who created the effects that the established laboratory guys said couldn't be done. We invented double-matted experiences. Polarization hadn't been used in movies before. ... When it was shown in France, the head of the Cinematheque overly praised the movie as a cinematic masterpiece, and from that point on, this movie began to acquire an underground reputation."
In 2010, Nick Vernier Band created a digital "Monkees reunion" through the release of Mister Bob (featuring the Monkees), a new song produced under license from Rhino Entertainment, containing vocal samples from the band's recording "Zilch".
The contract bridge convention known as either Last Train or Last Train to Clarksville was so named by its inventor, Jeff Meckstroth, after the Monkees' song.

Comic books 
A comic book series, The Monkees, was published in the United States by Dell Comics, which ran for 17 issues from 1967 to 1969.

In the United Kingdom, a Daily Mirror "Crazy Cartoon Book" featured four comic stories as well as four photos of the Monkees, all in black and white; it was published in 1967.

Biopic 
In 2000, VH-1 produced the television biopic Daydream Believers: The Monkees' Story. In 2002, the movie was released on DVD and featured both commentaries and interviews with Dolenz, Jones and Tork. The aired version did differ from the DVD release, as the TV version had an extended scene with all four Monkees meeting the Beatles, but with a shortened Cleveland concert segment. It was also available on VHS.

Musical 
A stage musical opened in the UK at the Manchester Opera House on Friday March 30, 2012, and was dedicated to Davy Jones (the Jones family attended the official opening on April 3). The production is a Jukebox musical and starred Stephen Kirwan, Ben Evans, Tom Parsons and Oliver Savile as actors playing the parts of the Monkees (respectively Dolenz, Jones, Nesmith, Tork) who are hired by an unscrupulous businessman to go on a world tour pretending to be the real band. The show includes 18 Monkees songs plus numbers by other 60s artists. It ran in Manchester as part of the "Manchester Gets it First" program until April 14, 2012, before a UK tour. Following its Manchester run, the show appeared in the Glasgow King's Theatre and the Sunderland Empire Theatre.

Awards and achievements

Grammy Awards
The Grammy Awards is an accolade by the National Academy of Recording Arts and Sciences (NARAS) of the United States to recognize outstanding achievement in the music industry. It shares recognition of the music industry as that of the other performance arts: Emmy Awards (television), the Tony Awards (stage performance), and the Academy Awards (motion pictures).

Notable achievements 
 Gave the Jimi Hendrix Experience their first U.S. concert tour exposure as an opening act in July 1967. Jimi Hendrix's heavy psychedelic guitar and sexual overtones did not go over well with the teenage girls in the audience, which eventually led to his leaving the tour early. 
 The band inspired Gene Roddenberry to introduce the character of Chekov in his Star Trek TV series in response to the popularity of Davy Jones, complete with hairstyle and appearance mimicking that of Jones.
 Inducted into America's Pop Music Hall of Fame in 2014.
 Honored by the Music Business Association (Music Biz) with an Outstanding Achievement Award celebrating the band's 50th anniversary on May 16, 2016.
 Inducted into the Vocal Group Hall of Fame in 2007.

Controversies

Studio recordings controversy
In early 1967, controversy hit concerning the Monkees' studio abilities. Dolenz told a reporter that the Wrecking Crew provided the backing tracks for the first two Monkees albums, and that his position as drummer was simply because a Monkee had to learn to play the drums, and he only knew the guitar. In the January 28, 1967 issue of Saturday Evening Post an article quoted Nesmith railing against the music creation process. "Do you know how debilitating it is to sit up and have to duplicate somebody else’s records?" he asked. "Tell the world we don’t record our own music." The whistle-blowing on themselves created a rift between the Monkees and producer Don Kirshner, ultimately resulting in his being fired from the project, and in the band taking creative control for the Monkees' third album.

But the Monkees' UK tour in 1967 received a chilly reception. The front pages of several UK and international music papers proclaimed that the group members did not always play their own instruments or sing the backing vocals in the studio. They were derisively dubbed the "Pre-Fab Four" and the Sunday Mirror called them a "disgrace to the pop world." Jimi Hendrix was their tour-opener that year, and he told Melody Maker magazine, "Oh God, I hate them! Dishwater… You can't knock anybody for making it, but people like the Monkees?" Dealing with the controversy proved challenging on the TV series. In an interview segment that closed episode No. 31, "Monkees at the Movies," first broadcast on April 17, 1967,  Bob Rafelson asked the group about accusations that they did not play their instruments in concert. Nesmith responded, "I'm fixin' to walk out there in front of fifteen thousand people, man! If I don't play my own instrument, I'm in a lot of trouble!" But the "Devil and Peter Tork" episode serves as a parable, as a Kirshner-like entrepreneur has Tork sign over his soul to be a success as a musician.

In November 1967, the wave of anti-Monkees sentiment was reaching its peak while they released their fourth album, Pisces, Aquarius, Capricorn, & Jones Ltd. The liner notes for the 1995 re-release of this album quote Nesmith: "The press went into a full-scale war against us, talking about how 'The Monkees are four guys who have no credits, no credibility whatsoever and have been trying to trick us into believing they are a rock band.' Number 1, not only was this not the case; the reverse was true. Number 2, for the press to report with genuine alarm that the Monkees were not a real rock band was looney tunes! It was one of the great goofball moments of the media, but it stuck." Jones stated in 1969 to Tiger Beat, "I get so angry when musicians say, 'Oh, your music is so bad,' because it's not bad to the kids. Those people who talk about 'doing their own thing' are groups that go and play in the clubs that hold 50 people while we're playing to 10,000 kids. You know, it hurts me to think that anybody thinks we're phony, because we're not. We're only doing what we think is our own thing."

Rolling Stone reported on October 11, 2011, that Tork believed the Monkees did not receive the respect they deserve. "The Monkees' songbook is one of the better songbooks in pop history", he said. "Certainly in the top five in terms of breadth and depth. It was revealed that we didn't play our own instruments on the records much at the very moment when the idealism of early Beatlemania in rock was at its peak. So we became the ultimate betrayers."

Timeline for the studio recordings controversy
 1965: At the end of the year, the four Monkees are cast in the TV show.
 April 1966: The Monkees begin rehearsing as a band to produce music for the upcoming TV show and records. Nesmith, Dolenz, and Tork were all experienced guitar players, and Nesmith and Tork were a little familiar with drums, but no one was a real expert in drumming. Jones was an able drummer and percussionist, but his experience from Broadway made him more known as a singer. Producer Ward Sylvester tells Tork that he would have signed the band even without a TV show.
 May 1966: Filming for the TV show starts, taking 12 hours a day for the cast of the Monkees. The public is informed in the beginning that the Monkees are "manufactured", as seen in this Washington Post report: "The series stars a fearsome foursome in the Monkees, a wholly manufactured singing group of attractive young men who come off as a combination of the Beatles, the Dead End Kids and the Marx Brothers. Critics will cry foul. Longhairs will demand, outraged, that they be removed from the air. But the kids will adore the Monkees [...] unlike other rock 'n' roll groups, the boys had never performed together before. Indeed, they'd never even met [...] they've been working to create their own sound."
 June 1966: Although the producers want the Monkees to create their own music, they have not progressed enough by this point and still lack the desired "upbeat, young, happy, driving, pulsating sound". Dolenz would later state, "I'm sure that Rafelson and Schneider said in all honesty, 'Yeah, don't worry, when we start going you're gonna record your own tunes and it will be wonderful.' But the things get caught up in the inertia of the moment. NBC gets involved. RCA gets involved. Screen Gems gets involved. Millions and millions of dollars are on the line [...] people aren't as forthcoming. Mike's style was very distinct, country-western, Peter was very folk-rock, neither of which at the time would have been considered mainstream pop. Davy would have done all Broadway tunes [...] I ended up singing the leads [...] pop-rock was more my style." However, selections of Nesmith's authorship and composition are used from the beginning.
 June 10, 1966: The Monkees' first recording sessions take place. These sessions feature members of the Wrecking Crew, a group of studio musicians in Los Angeles who played on several Monkees album tracks, mostly those produced by Nesmith. These sessions ultimately prove unsuccessful, however, and most future sessions in 1966 will feature the Candy Store Prophets, a studio band led by Boyce & Hart.
 June 25, 1966: Nesmith produces his first Monkees track in a recording studio, his two self-composed songs "All the King's Horses", "The Kind of Girl I Could Love", plus "I Don't Think You Know Me", as a way for Raybert Productions to fulfill their promise to him to allow him to produce and record his own music. He is not allowed to play the instruments.
 July 1966: Various producers from Boyce & Hart to Jack Keller to Nesmith continue to record sessions. Nesmith gets all four members to sing on his productions. On July 18, 1966, Nesmith also gets Tork to play guitar on the songs he is producing for the first time. Sessions continue in this manner, with the hired producers Boyce & Hart and Jack Keller and Monkees member Nesmith producing/recording songs in the studio through November 1966.
 October 1966: The Monkees' debut album is released. Group member Nesmith, in particular, is angered when he sees the album cover, because he thinks it makes it look like they played all of the instruments.
 October 2, 1966: The Monkees give their first public interview, which appears in The New York Times, in which Jones is asked if the big push for the Monkees is fair to the real rock groups, to which he responds, "... That's the breaks, but you can't fool the people, you really can't."
 October 24, 1966: Newsweek interviews the Monkees. They are asked how the music is created. Davy Jones tells them, "This isn't a rock 'n' roll group. This is an act."
 December 1966: The Monkees perform live in concert starting December 3, 1966. TV Week in the meantime, interviews Rafelson about why the Monkees' public access to interviews is limited, wondering if it could be related to embarrassing questions regarding their musical prowess, to which Rafelson assures that they do all of their own playing and singing. He also states that interviews are almost impossible due to their spending 12 hours a day filming the TV show, 4 hours recording, rehearsing for concert tours, and spending some weekends making personal appearance tours. During this time frame, the Monkees are generally barred from making television appearances on shows outside of their own, as Raybert fears the group's overexposure.
 December 27, 1966: The Monkees are again interviewed about their music in Look magazine. Tork responds, "We have the potential, but there's not time to practice." Dolenz says, "We're advertisers. We're selling the Monkees. It's gotta be that way." Nesmith says, "They're in the middle of something good and they're trying to sell something. They want us to be the Beatles, but we're not. We're us. We're funny."
 January 1967: The Monkees' second album is released while they were on tour, without the Monkees' knowledge. This upsets Nesmith and Tork, as they had been told that they were going to be doing their own album. Dolenz and Jones are initially indifferent because to them, coming from the acting world, it was just a soundtrack to the TV show and they were doing their job by singing what they were asked to sing. But when they see how angry Nesmith and Tork are, they too join in the revolt.
 January 16, 1967: Four months after their first single is released, the Monkees hold their first recording session as a self-contained, fully functioning band.
 January 28, 1967: Band member Nesmith speaks to the Saturday Evening Post in an exposé, stating, "The music had nothing to do with us. It was totally dishonest. Do you know how debilitating it is to sit up and have to duplicate somebody else's records? That's really what we're doing. The music happened in spite of the Monkees. It was what Kirshner wanted to do. Our records are not our forte. I don't care if we never sell another record. Maybe we were manufactured [...] Tell the world we're synthetic because [...] we are. Tell them the Monkees are wholly man-made overnight, that millions of dollars have been poured into this thing. Tell the world we don't record our own music. But that's us they see on television. That show is really a part of us. They're not seeing something invalid." Decades later, Nesmith reflected, "The press decided they were going to unload on us as being somehow illegitimate, somehow false. That we were making an attempt to dupe the public, when in fact it was me that was making the attempt to maintain the integrity. So, the press went into a full-scale war against us. Telling us the Monkees are four guys who have no credits, no credibility whatsoever, who have been trying to trick us into believing that they are a rock band. Number one, not only was it not the case, the reverse was true. Number two, [for] the press to report with genuine alarm that the Monkees were not a real rock band was looney tunes. It was one of the great goofball moments of the media, but it stuck."
 February 4, 1967: Although the Monkees have continued to play and record their own music for their upcoming album, Jones records some songs with hired producer Jeff Barry.
 February 25, 1967: Jones is interviewed for the New Musical Express, and says, "I can only speak for myself. I am an actor and I have never pretended to be anything else. The public have made me into a rock 'n' roll singer. No one is trying to fool anyone! People have tried to put us down by saying we copied the Beatles. So, all right, maybe the Monkees is a half-hour Hard Day's Night. But now we read that the Who are working on a TV  a group. Now who's copying who?"
 February 27, 1967: Kirshner is dismissed as Music Coordinator for the Monkees, primarily due to his handling of the third would-be-but-withdrawn single from the Monkees. Lester Sill takes his place. The Monkees continue recording their own songs, with them playing instruments, getting ready for their next album. In the meantime, the Nesmith-penned "The Girl I Knew Somewhere" is released as part of the Monkees third single, which features the Monkees playing as a self-contained band, which becomes a top 40 hit.
 May 1967: The Monkees' first self-made album, Headquarters, is released.

After Headquarters, the Monkees started using a mixture of themselves playing along with other musicians, including members of the Wrecking Crew and Candy Store Prophets along with other musicians such as Stephen Stills, Neil Young, and Harry Nilsson; but they still wrote, sang, produced, and played on their remaining albums, except for their final offering from the original incarnation in 1970, Changes, which was recorded after Nesmith and Tork had left the group and featured Dolenz and Jones singing to the backing tracks of what Jones referred to in the liner notes of the 1994 reissue that album as "a rejected Andy Kim album". In the same liner notes, Jones stated that he was unhappy about that recording and claimed that it was not a real album. The final album featured one Dolenz composition.

Tork commented on some of the controversy when writing about Jones's death: "When we first met, I was confronted with a slick, accomplished, young performer, vastly more experienced than I in the ways of show biz, and yes, I was intimidated. Englishness was at a high premium in my world, and his experience dwarfed my entertainer's life as a hippie, basket-passing folk singer on the Greenwich Village coffee house circuit. If anything, I suppose I was selected for the cast of 'The Monkees' TV show partly as a rough-hewn counterpart to David's sophistication. [...] the Monkees—the group now, not the TV series—took a lot of flack for being 'manufactured,' by which our critics meant that we hadn't grown up together, paying our dues, sleeping five to a room, trying to make it as had the Beatles and Rolling Stones. Furthermore, critics said, the Monkees' first albums—remember albums?—were almost entirely recorded by professional studio musicians, with hardly any input from any of us beyond lead vocals. I felt this criticism keenly, coming as I did from the world of the ethical folk singer, basically honoring the standards of the naysayers. We did play as a group live on tour."

Meeting with the Beatles
Critics of the Monkees observed that they were simply the "Pre-Fab Four", a made-for-TV knockoff of the Beatles; however, the Beatles themselves took it in stride and even hosted a party for the Monkees when they visited England. The Beatles were recording Sgt. Pepper's Lonely Hearts Club Band at the time of the Monkees' visit and as such, the party inspired the line in the Monkees' tune "Randy Scouse Git", written by Dolenz, which read, "the four kings of EMI are sitting stately on the floor."

George Harrison praised their self-produced musical attempts, saying, "It's obvious what's happening, there's talent there. They're doing a TV show, it's a difficult chore and I wouldn't be in their shoes for the world. When they get it all sorted out, they might turn out to be the best." Monkees member Peter Tork was later one of the musicians on Harrison's album Wonderwall Music, playing Paul McCartney's five-string banjo.

Nesmith attended the Beatles' recording session for "A Day in the Life" at Abbey Road Studios; he can be seen in the Beatles' home movies, including one scene where he is talking with John Lennon. During the conversation, Nesmith had reportedly asked Lennon "Do you think we're a cheap imitation of the Beatles, your movies and your records?" to which Lennon assuredly replied, "I think you're the greatest comic talent since the Marx Brothers. I've never missed one of your programs." Nesmith wrote about this encounter on Facebook:

When the Beatles were recording Sgt. Peppers, Phyllis and I spent a few days with John and wife Cynthia Lennon at their home, and one in the studio with "the boys." That's where those pictures of John and I come from—the "Day in the Life" session. The minute I had the wherewithal—cachet and money—I raced to London and looked up John.

During the '60s it seemed to me London was the center of the World and the Beatles were the center of London and the Sgt Pepper session was the center of the Beatles. It was an extraordinary time, I thought, and I wanted to get as close as I could to the heart of it. But like a hurricane the center was not stormy or tumultuous. It was exciting, but it was calm, and to an extent peaceful. The confidence of the art permeated the atmosphere. Serene—and really, really fun. Then I discovered the reason for this. During that time in one of our longer, more reflective, talks I realized that John was not aware of who the Beatles were. Of course he could not be. He was clueless in this regard. He had never seen or experienced them. In the strange paradox of fame, none of the Beatles ever saw the Beatles the way we did. Certainly not the way I did. I loved them beyond my ability to express it. As the years passed and I met more and more exceptional people sitting in the center of their own hurricane I saw they all shared this same sensibility. None of them could actually know the force of their own work.

Dolenz was also in the studio during a Sgt. Pepper session, which he mentioned while broadcasting for radio WCBS-FM in New York (incidentally, he interviewed Ringo Starr on his program). On February 21, 1967, he attended the overdub and mixing session for the Beatles' "Fixing a Hole" at EMI's Abbey Road studio 2.

During the 1970s, during Lennon's infamous "lost weekend", Lennon, Ringo Starr, Micky Dolenz, Harry Nilsson and Keith Moon often hung out together, and were collectively known in the press as "The Hollywood Vampires".

Paul McCartney can be seen in the 2002 concert film Back in the U.S. singing "Hey, Hey, We're The Monkees", the theme from The Monkees television show, while backstage.

The Monkees "Cuddly Toy" and "Daddy's Song" were written by songwriter Harry Nilsson. "Cuddly Toy" was recorded several months before Nilsson's own debut in October 1967. At the press conference announcing the formation of Apple, the Beatles named Nilsson as both their favorite American artist and as their favorite American group. Derek Taylor, the Beatles' press officer, had introduced them to Nilsson's music.

In 1995, Ringo Starr joined Jones, Tork and Dolenz to film a Pizza Hut commercial.

Julian Lennon was a fan, stating at the time of Jones' death, "You did some great work!"

Rock and Roll Hall of Fame
In June 2007, Tork complained to the New York Post that Jann Wenner had blackballed the Monkees from the Rock and Roll Hall of Fame in Cleveland, Ohio. Tork stated:

[Wenner] doesn't care what the rules are and just operates how he sees fit. It is an abuse of power. I don't know whether the Monkees belong in the Hall of Fame, but it's pretty clear that we're not in there because of a personal whim. Jann seems to have taken it harder than everyone else, and now, 40 years later, everybody says, 'What's the big deal? Everybody else does it.' [Uses studio artists or backing bands.] Nobody cares now except him. He feels his moral judgment in 1967 and 1968 is supposed to serve in 2007.

In a Facebook post, Nesmith stated that he did not know if the Monkees belonged in the Hall of Fame because he could only see the impact of the Monkees from the inside, and further stated: "I can see the HOF (Hall of Fame) is a private enterprise. It seems to operate as a business, and the inductees are there by some action of the owners of the Enterprise. The inductees appear to be chosen at the owner's pleasure. This seems proper to me. It is their business in any case. It does not seem to me that the HOF carries a public mandate, nor should it be compelled to conform to one."

In 1992, Davy Jones spoke to People magazine, stating "I'm not as wealthy as some entertainers, but I work hard, and I think the best is yet to come. I know I'm never going to make the Rock and Roll Hall of Fame, but maybe there's something else for me in show business. I've been given a talent—however big or little—that has given me many opportunities. I've got to try to use it the best way I can. A lot of people go days without having someone hug them or shake their hand. I get that all the time."

In 2015, Micky Dolenz said, "As far as the Rock & Roll Hall of Fame I’ve never been one to chase awards or anything like that; it’s never been very important to me. I was very proud to win an Emmy for The Monkees, having come out of television as a kid. When we won the Emmy for best TV show in '66 or '67 that was a huge feather in my cap. But I’ve never chased that kind of stuff. I’ve never done a project and thought, 'What do I do here to win an award?' Specifically as far as the Rock & Roll Hall of Fame I’ve been very flattered that the fans and people have championed the Monkees. Very flattered and honored that they do. If you know anything about the organization, and I’ve done charity work for the foundation, the Hall of Fame is a private club."

Various magazines and news outlets, such as Time, NPR, The Christian Science Monitor, Goldmine, Yahoo! Music and MSNBC have argued that the Monkees belong in the Rock and Roll Hall of Fame.

Members
 Micky Dolenz – lead and backing vocals, rhythm guitar, drums, percussion 
 Davy Jones – lead and backing vocals, percussion, drums, rhythm guitar, bass 
 Michael Nesmith – lead and rhythm guitar, keyboards, backing and lead vocals 
 Peter Tork – bass, rhythm and lead guitar, keyboards, banjo, backing and occasional lead vocals

Timeline

Discography

 The Monkees (1966)
 More of The Monkees (1967)
 Headquarters (1967)
 Pisces, Aquarius, Capricorn & Jones Ltd. (1967)
 The Birds, The Bees & the Monkees (1968)
 Head (1968)
 Instant Replay (1969)
 The Monkees Present (1969)
 Changes (1970)
 Pool It! (1987)
 Justus (1996)
 Good Times! (2016)
 Christmas Party (2018)

Originally unreleased recordings 
Beginning in 1987, Rhino Records started to make available previously unreleased Monkees recordings on a series of albums called Missing Links. Having numerous quality songwriters, musicians, producers and arrangers—along with high budgets—at their hands while making albums during the 1960s, the band was able to record as many songs as the Beatles in half the time.

The three volumes of this initial series contained 59 songs. These include the group's first recordings as a self-contained band, including the intended single "All Of Your Toys", Nesmith's Nashville sessions, and alternate versions of songs featured only on the television series. The Listen to the Band box set also contained previously unreleased recordings, as did the 1994–95 series CD album reissues. Rhino/Rhino Handmade's Deluxe Edition reissue series has also included alternate mixes, unreleased songs, and the soundtrack to 33⅓ Revolutions per Monkee.

Tours
 North American Tour (1966–67)
 British Tour (1967)
 Pacific Rim Tour (1968)
 North American Tour (1969) (Dolenz, Jones, Nesmith)
 20th Anniversary World Tour (1986) (Dolenz, Jones, Tork)
 Here We Come Again Tour (1987–88) (Dolenz, Jones, Tork), for most of the 1987 shows, "Weird Al" Yankovic was the opening act.
 The Monkees Live (1989) (Dolenz, Jones, Tork)
 The Monkees Summer Tour (1989) (Dolenz, Jones, Tork)
 Monkees: The 30th Anniversary Tour (1996) (Dolenz, Jones, Tork)
 Justus Tour (1997)
 North American Tour (1997) (Dolenz, Jones, Tork)
 U.S. Tour (2001) (Dolenz, Jones, Tork; Tork removed from the tour partway through)
 Monkeemania Returns Tour (2001–2002) (Dolenz, Jones)
 An Evening with The Monkees: The 45th Anniversary Tour (2011) (Dolenz, Jones, Tork)
 An Evening with The Monkees (Fall 2012) (Dolenz, Nesmith, Tork)
 A Midsummer's Night with the Monkees (Summer 2013) (Dolenz, Nesmith, Tork)
 The Monkees Live in Concert (Spring 2014) (Dolenz, Nesmith, Tork)
 An Evening with the Monkees (2015) (Dolenz, Tork)
 50th Anniversary Tour (2016) (Dolenz, Tork with selected appearances by Nesmith)
 The Mike and Micky Show (2019)  (Dolenz, Nesmith) (2019 dates billed as the Monkees)
 An Evening with the Monkees (2020; postponed)
 The Monkees Farewell Tour (Fall 2021)

Related non-Monkees tours
 The Great Golden Hits of The Monkees (1975–77) (Dolenz, Jones, Boyce and Hart)
 Sound of The Monkees (1986; 1987) (Jones, Tork)
 Micky and Davy: Together Again (1994–95) (Dolenz, Jones)
 The Monkees Present: The Mike and Micky Show (2018–19)  (Dolenz, Nesmith) (early dates billed as a Dolenz and Nesmith duo and not the Monkees)
 Micky Dolenz Celebrates the Monkees (2022) (Dolenz)
 The Monkees Celebrated by Micky Dolenz (2023) (Dolenz)

See also

 List of The Monkees episodes
 Monkeemobile

References

Further reading

External links

 
 Micky Dolenz's official website
 Mike Nesmith Interview - Rocker Magazine 2013
 Peter Tork Interview NAMM Oral History Library (2009)
 FBI Records: The Vault - The Monkees at vault.fbi.gov
 

 

1966 establishments in California
2021 disestablishments in California
American pop rock music groups
Arista Records artists
Articles which contain graphical timelines
Bell Records artists
Bubblegum pop groups
Colgems Records artists
Musical groups disestablished in 1970
Musical groups disestablished in 2021
Musical groups established in 1966
Musical groups from Los Angeles
Musical groups reestablished in 2010
Musical quartets
Psychedelic pop music groups
RCA Records artists
Rock and roll music groups
Television personalities from Los Angeles